Elena Kucharik is a children's illustrator known for her artwork across the entire line of Care Bears items from the 1980s. She was co-creator of that franchise along with Linda Denham. Kucharik is also an illustrator of the Christian children's book series Little Blessings published by Tyndale House.

Kucharik was born in Cleveland, Ohio and received a bachelor's degree of Fine Arts from Kent State University.

Her Care Bears illustrations were the most detailed of all the illustrators who have worked on the franchise. As the lead Care Bears illustrator, Elena worked for American Greetings Corporation, who owns the trademark and her original art.

References

External links
Elena's Custom Paintings

Care Bears
Living people
Artists from Cleveland
American women illustrators
American illustrators
1942 births
Kent State University alumni
American people of Romanian descent
Eastern Orthodox Christians from the United States